Berle Sanford Rosenberg (born December 15, 1951) is an American operatic tenor and vocal coach. He has performed in opera houses and concert halls in Switzerland, France, United States, Italy, Austria, Germany, Poland, Hungary, Romania, Slovakia, the Czech Republic and the former Soviet Union, and has recorded two solo recitals released on CD by Olympia of London.

Career
Tenor Berle Sanford Rosenberg was born New York City  Dec.15, 1951, began his vocal studies at the age of seventeen with opera impresario and voice teacher Alfredo Salmaggi, later with Italian tenor Giovanni Consiglio and Spanish soprano Carolina Segrera. He was greatly influenced by a short collaboration with the legendary Italian baritone Tito Gobbi.  (Gobbi was coaching in New York City). Rosenberg was quoted by saying that Italian tenor Daniele Barioni and Italian baritone Matteo Manuguerra, both close friends, were instrumental in his development with his singing of the Italian repertoire. In 1980 Rosenberg began studying vocal technique with Rita Patanè and later with Carlo Bergonzi, who then trained him in bel canto vocal technique for the next three years.
 
In June 1984 Rosenberg flew to Rome, Italy and studied operatic repertoire with Giuseppe Morelli and Rolando Nicolosi of the Teatro dell'Opera di Roma; in Turin with Mario Braggio of Teatro Regio di Torino, Antonio Beltrami of RAI, in Milan with Michelangelo Veltri, Eduardo Müller, Sergiu Commissiona, Donato Renzetti, Moshe Atzmon, Antonio Tonini and Adalberto Tonini, Daniel Chain, Vincenzo Scalera and Dante Mazzola both of La Scala. In June 1984, while singing in Enna Sicily, he met Giuseppe Di Stefano who took an interest in helping to develop his vocal interpretation. Rosenberg continued to live and work in Italy, and sang in most of the major Italian cities, including: Milan, Verona, Bussetto, Bergamo, Brescia, Piacenza, Parma, Florence, Catania, Palermo, Enna, Siracusa, Pavia, Turin, Bologna, Venice and Rome. He participated in many international festivals, including: Assisi, Fiesole, Val de Charente, Metz, Budapest, Wraclaw Cantans, Oradea, Timișoara, Bucharest, Cluj-Napoca, Minsk and the summer festivals of Bolzano, and Vienna. In Italy, Rosenberg performed for RAI television in various concert and opera productions, including Petite Messe Solennelle (Piacenza), Rigoletto (Milan Conservatory), In 1989, Berle went to the Minsk Symphony, to perform in the Eurovision production of the Verdi Requiem, in memoriam of the fifth anniversary of the Chernobyl atomic power plant tragedy. In 1990, the Centennial Birthday Concert for Beniamino Gigli (Recanati) and the 1991 RAI Christmas Concert with Joan Sutherland and Richard Bonynge Enna, Sicily.

In September 1985, along with Giuseppe Di Stefano, Rosenberg was invited to Sweden to sing at the Jussi Björling Memorial Concert held in Stockholm. Anna Lisa Björling the tenor's widow, asked him to return,  which began his long connection with Sweden. In Feb. 1992, in Budapest, he contracted a critical illness which he survived, but left him unable to continue his career. After a long convalescence, Rosenberg increasingly dedicated his time to teaching bel canto vocal technique and in 1995 with the help of Lars Björling the great tenor's son, he returned to Sweden. In 2000, he was employed as a consulting vocal coach at the opera school in Gothenburg and in 2005 at Ersta Sköndal University College in Stockholm as Adjukt Professor. With the birth of his beloved son David, on Dec. 10th, 2004 (Stockholm) Rosenberg continues to teach, hold master classes, and perform in occasional concerts and recitals both in Sweden and Hungary where he resides since 2016.

Discography
O Sole Mio! – Neapolitan Songs (Berle Sanford Rosenberg, tenor; Nemiga Wind Virtuosi; Arkady Berin, conductor). Label: Olympia OCD 371
Berle Sanford Rosenberg Live From Budapest (Berle Sanford Rosenberg, tenor; Budapest Concert Orchestra; Janos Acs, conductor). Label: Olympia OCD 370                                        *Romance & Classics Vol.1, CD.2, O Sole Mio (Berle Sanford Rosenberg, tenor; Nemiga Wind Virtuosi; Arkady Berin, conductor). Label: HOTTOWN PA 3928/9

References

1951 births
Living people
American operatic tenors
Singers from New York City
American vocal coaches
Classical musicians from New York (state)